Prasophyllum maccannii, commonly known as the inland leek orchid, is a species of orchid endemic to Victoria. It has a single tubular green leaf and up to forty green, greenish-pink or brownish flowers. It is found in the central-west of the state, growing in open forest.

Description
The flowers are green, greenish-pink or brownish and as with others in the genus, are inverted so that the labellum is above the column rather than below it. The lateral sepals are a similar size, linear to lance-shaped and joined to each other, although sometimes only in the lower half. The edges of the erect part of the labellum are sometimes slightly wavy and there is a raised, greenish, tapering callus in the centre of the labellum and extending almost to its tip. Flowering occurs in November and December.

Taxonomy and naming
Prasophyllum maccannii was first formally described in 2006 by David Jones and Dean Rouse. The description was published in Australian Orchid Research from a specimen collected from near Ponomal. The specific epithet (maccannii) honours the Victorian naturalist Ian Robert McCann (1914-2003).

Distribution and habitat
The inland leek orchid grows in open forest in the central west of Victoria.

Conservation
Prasophyllum maccannii is listed as Endangered under the Victorian Flora and Fauna Guarantee Act 1988.

References

External links 
 
 

maccannii
Flora of Victoria (Australia)
Endemic orchids of Australia
Plants described in 2006